Drosera ultramafica is a species of sundew native to the highlands of Malesia. It is thought to be most closely related to Drosera spatulata, Drosera neocaledonica and Drosera oblanceolata. The taxon is readily distinguished from the former by its general habit and preference for mafic, upland habitats, and from the latter species by specific morphological differences, in addition to the fact that their geographical ranges do not overlap.

References

External links
 New Species - Drosera ultramafica

Carnivorous plants of Asia
ultramafica
Plants described in 2011